The Break-up Season is a 2014 Chinese comedy romance film directed by Yao Yu. It was released on October 17.

Cast
Gu Liya
Angel Wei
Rick Xu
Zhang Xiaojun
Ji Feilong
Zheng Yuzhi
Ma Junqin
Wang Jieshi
Wu Haiyan

Reception
By October 20, the film had earned ¥0.37 million at the Chinese box office.

References

2014 romantic comedy films
Chinese romantic comedy films